is a stable of sumo wrestlers, one of the Nishonoseki group of stables. The name of the stable changed in January 2022 after the Japan Sumo Association approved the changing of Kisenosato's toshiyori (elder name) from Araiso to Nishonoseki, following the retirement of former ōzeki Wakashimazu. 

In December 2021 Nishonoseki recruited a 18-year-old student from his hometown Ibaraki Prefecture's  Ushiku Senior High School, whom he had spotted while frequenting the school's sumo club.

Nakamura-oyakata (former sekiwake Yoshikaze) moved to the stable after the January 2022 tournament, due to the closure of his own Oguruma stable, and brought former maegashira Tomokaze with him. Tomokaze was promoted back to jūryō following the January 2023 tournament, becoming the stable's first sekitori. 

In March 2022 the stable recruited a pair of identical twins, Hayashiryū and Rinko, from the same Nagano sumo club as former ōzeki Mitakeumi. As of January 2023, it had 16 wrestlers.

Owners
2021-present: Nishonoseki Yutaka (iin, the 72nd yokozuna Kisenosato)

Notable active wrestlers

Tomokaze (best rank maegashira)

Coaches
Nakamura Masatsugu (iin, former sekiwake Yoshikaze)

Referees
Kimura Ennosuke (makushita gyōji, real name Satoru Ishimaru)

Usher
Rokurō (jūryō yobidashi, real name Kenzō Araki)

Hairdressers
Tokoni (fifth class tokoyama)

Location and access
139-1 Arakawahongō, Ami, Inashiki, Ibaraki Prefecture
10-minute walk from Hitachino-Ushiku Station (Jōban Line)

The present Nishonoseki stable building was opened in June 2022. Prior to that, the stable members trained on an interim basis at the University of Tsukuba.

See also
 Araiso stable
 Heya
 Japan Sumo Association
 List of active sumo wrestlers
 List of past sumo wrestlers
 List of sumo stables
 List of sumo elders
 List of yokozuna
 Toshiyori

References

External links
Nishonoseki stable page at Japan Sumo Association
Home Page

Active sumo stables